Laurance Frederic Shaffer (August 12, 1903 – July 20, 1976) was an American psychologist and a past president of the American Psychological Association (APA).

Biography
Shaffer was a lieutenant colonel in the U.S. Army Air Forces and he opened the first pilot selection examining unit during World War II. He was a department chair at Columbia University and he served as editor of the Journal of Consulting Psychology. Shaffer promoted the concept of mental hygiene, which combined the notions of health promotion and psychological adjustment. He was the APA president in 1953.

References

1903 births
1976 deaths
Presidents of the American Psychological Association
Columbia University faculty
20th-century American psychologists